Ramnagar railway station is a small railway station in Nainital district, Uttarakhand. Its code is RMR. It serves Ramnagar city. The station consists of four platforms.  The nearest airport is Pantnagar Airport at the distance of 55 km.

In 1907, during the British Raj the railway line in Uttarakhand was extended from Moradabad to Ramnagar. Ramnagar railway station is under the administrative control of the Izzatnagar division of the North Eastern Railway zone of the Indian Railways. The station is located about 65 km from Nainital. It has direct rail links to Kashipur, Moradabad, Delhi, Bareilly, Budaun, Lucknow, Haridwar, Chandigarh, Gurgaon, Mumbai, Agra, Jaisalmer and Varanasi.

Major trains  
Some important trains that originate or terminate here:

 Varanasi–Ramnagar Express
 Haridwar–Ramnagar Intercity Express
 Kashipur–Ramnagar Special
 Corbett Park Link Express
 Bandra Terminus–Ramnagar Express
 Agra Fort–Ramnagar Weekly Express
 Moradabad–Ramnagar Fast Passenger
 Moradabad–Ramnagar Passenger
 Kashipur–Ramnagar Passenger

References

Railway junction stations in India
Railway stations in Nainital district
Izzatnagar railway division